John Lee Paul (born Johan Leendert Paul, on March 12, 1939) is an American racing driver, convicted felon and fugitive. After his racing career, which saw him win both U.S. classic endurance races, twenty-four hours at Daytona and twelve hours of Sebring, he served a fifteen-year prison sentence for a variety of crimes including drug trafficking and shooting a Federal witness. In 2001, he disappeared on his boat while being sought for questioning by officials regarding the disappearance of his ex-girlfriend. Paul's status is unknown. He is sometimes known in the motorsport scene as John Paul Sr. or John Paul.

Early life
Paul emigrated to the United States from The Netherlands in 1956 with his family, settling in Muncie, Indiana and legally changing his name to John Lee Paul. He attended Ball State University and then received a scholarship to Harvard University, where he received a master's degree in business. He became a successful mutual fund manager, and a millionaire. In 1960, his wife Joyce gave birth to a son, John Jr., who went on to become a successful driver on his father's team, but also served prison time for joining in some of his father's numerous criminal activities.

Racing career
Paul started club-level sportscar road racing in the late 1960s, winning the Sports Car Club of America (SCCA) Northeast Regional Championship in 1968. When his wife and son left him in 1972, Paul left racing for a while, living on a sailboat he had purchased. He resumed racing in 1975 – now with his son, who had chosen to return to him, as a part-time member of his crew. He appeared at 1978 24 Hours of Le Mans for the Dick Barbour Racing team, taking a class win in IMSA GTX class – partnered by fellow American, Dick Barbour, and English driver, Brian Redman – in his first attempt at the French classic. This followed his class win in the 12 Hours of Sebring earlier that season.

In 1979, Paul won the Trans-Am Series race at Mosport by a margin of 33 seconds. He would win a total of six races, en route to winning the Trans-Am title. He had already won the World Challenge for Endurance Drivers title the season before. In 1980, Paul began teaming with his son, and on May 26 Paul remarried to Chalice Alford, holding the ceremony on the infield at Lime Rock Park. Later in the day he teamed with his son to win the day's race, the Coca-Cola 400, making them the first father-son duo to win an IMSA Camel GT race. It was the first IMSA GT race Paul Jr. had ever entered.

Father and son paired up again to win the Road America Pabst 500. Paul Sr. finished second in the IMSA GT series. In 1980 he won the World Challenge for Endurance Drivers by just four points over British driver John Fitzpatrick. He competed mainly in his specially modified Porsche 935s prepared by his own team, JLP Racing, operating out of Lawrenceville, Georgia.

In 1982, Paul Sr., teamed up with his son to win the 12 Hours of Sebring and, with third driver Rolf Stommelen, the 24 Hours of Daytona, running a race record . Together, the Pauls won three races. As a solo driver, Junior won another four, all in JLP Racing-prepared Porsche or Lola-Chevrolet T600. 1982 would be Paul Sr.'s last year as a driver. Lack of a major sponsor, even with the team's success, meant expenses overcame his earnings.

Criminal activity

Drug possession
The Pauls had their first legal troubles when on January 10, 1979, Paul Jr. and Christopher Schill were caught by customs agents loading equipment onto a pickup truck on the bank of a canal in the Louisiana bayous after dark. Following questioning, when one of them smelled marijuana on their clothing, Paul Sr. was apprehended on his 42-foot boat named Lady Royale, where customs discovered marijuana residue and $10,000 on board. A rented truck was discovered nearby, which contained 1,565 pounds (710 kg) of marijuana. In court, all three pleaded guilty to marijuana possession charges, where each was placed on three years' probation and fined $32,500.

Disappearance of Chalice Paul
Chalice Alford Barnett, then 32, wed professional race car driver John Paul Sr. on May 26, 1980, at Lime Rock Park in Salisbury, Connecticut. She went to Palm Beach, Florida at the end of 1980, leaving John behind in Roswell, Georgia, and the two split up within a year. She purportedly vanished in Key West, Florida, during the summer of 1981. Chalice Paul was cast to be in the Burt Reynolds film, Sharky's Machine being filmed in Atlanta in the summer of 1981. John paid her a visit in Atlanta and persuaded her to accompany him on a quick second honeymoon to Key West, Florida, before her filming. She vanished sometime that summer of 1981 at 33 but John never bothered to contact her family about her disappearance. 

John asserted that she left on her own accord. In 1982, when John Paul could be reached in Atlanta by phone, he informed her that he had left Chalice in Key West. One of Chalice Paul's sisters, who provided a number of contradicting accounts and versions of what happened after she last saw Chalice, may have been involved in her disappearance. While John Paul Sr. was still legally wed to Chalice Paul, he married Jeanette Hope Ruben Haywood, the sister of well-known racer Hurley Haywood, whose first name is Harris. In Atlanta, Georgia, she initially filed for divorce, then ten days later she withdrew it and re-filed for alimony. Chalice Paul was last seen alive boarding a plane to go to Florida from Atlanta, Georgia and she remains missing. Paul is considered a suspect in her disappearance.

Shooting of witness
On April 19, 1983, an individual named Stephen Carson was shot in the chest, abdomen and leg in Crescent Beach, Florida. Carson had been given immunity in a drug trafficking case. He testified that Paul Sr. had approached him, ordered him into the trunk of his car, and shot at him five times when he fled rather than comply. Paul then fled when a companion of Carson's began shouting. Paul was arrested, but while out on bail fled before his trial. Paul was apprehended by Swiss authorities in January 1985, served a six-month sentence in Switzerland for using a false passport, and was extradited back to the United States in March 1986. At the same time, Paul Jr. pleaded guilty to racketeering and received a five-year sentence. He had refused to testify against his father, who had been indicted as the ringleader of a drug trafficking ring that also included his father, Lee. On June 4, 1986, Paul Sr. pleaded guilty to attempted first-degree murder and received a sentence of twenty years, later expanded to twenty-five years after additional sentences were added.

Attempted escape
On March 10, 1987, Paul and another inmate unsuccessfully attempted to escape from prison by spraying a mixture of hot sauce and Pine Sol in a guards face then scaling a 12-foot fence. The guard recovered and fired two shots, scaring the inmates into surrendering. There was a stolen pickup truck in the parking lot that authorities suspect was for the two inmates. Paul served his sentence in USP Leavenworth. Paul was paroled on July 2, 1999.

Disappearance of Colleen Wood
Shortly following release from prison in 1999, Paul met an office manager named Colleen Wood. Wood moved to Fort Lauderdale, Florida from Ohio in the late 1990s. She was employed as an office manager at Lighthouse Point Marina. She would shortly leave her job, sell her condominium and move in with Paul on his 55-foot schooner to embark on a planned five-year around-the-world boating trip. He renamed the vessel The Diamond Girl (she was originally named The Island Girl) in early 2000. 

Wood vanished sometime during the middle of December 2000. On December 3, she made a call to her son in Ohio and informed him that she and Paul would be leaving soon for their trip. On December 13, Wood received an invitation to a holiday party from one of her friends. Wood, according to the acquaintance, was in Key West, Florida, when they spoke. She allegedly appeared in good spirits. Wood vanished without a trace, and has not been heard from since.<ref>Missing: Colleen Wood  web site of Unseen Mysteries'.</ref> In April 2001, Wood's family informed Florida authorities that she was missing. Sometime earlier, her cell phone service had been terminated. Paul was interviewed by investigators in May 2001. He at first complied with the investigation. After discovering about Paul's past in 2001, her family started to worry about her safety. Police questioned Paul in connection with the disappearance, but no charges were filed.

According to Wood's close ones, if she had known about Paul's past, she would have been upset. Paul claimed to have had a financial disagreement with Wood in the middle of December 2000. He claimed that after she got off the boat, she came back with two men to get rid of her possessions. According to Wood's son, Paul allegedly told his daughter that Wood broke up with his prior girlfriend because he was upset about something that happened with her. Paul is also said to have presented Wood's son with the same explanation for her disappearance as he did to authorities. Paul reportedly departed from the Fort Lauderdale area during the summer of 2001 on his boat and disappeared, likely in violation of his parole. Authorities stated that he is not a suspect in Wood's case, but they would like to question him again regarding her disappearance.

Authorities found that between December 2000 and February 2001, about $38,000 had been taken out of Wood's bank account via an ATM in Fort Lauderdale. It is unlikely that Wood took the money out on her own. Surveillance photographs from the ATMs showed that at least two women, neither of them being Colleen, were using her credit cards. Authorities believed that these women were pretending to be Colleen and were making the transactions. The two women who used Colleen's credit cards were found and identified by detectives. They said to the authorities that the same man had led them to various ATMs and handed them Colleen's cards and PIN information. Ten to twenty percent of the money went to them, and he retained the remainder for himself. The man was identified by the women as John. It is believed John used her computer to access the credit card data. In December 2001, Wood's credit card was used to make two ad purchases from a Florida publication. One of the advertisements was for a position as a first mate on a yacht, and the other was a personal ad from a man looking for a female. Investigators discovered that the advertising were recently acquired in Wood's name by an unidentified male. John is considered a person of interest in Colleen's case. Detectives would like to find him to question him again about Colleen's disappearance.

Personality
Paul Sr.'s "tantrums", his sociopathic and temperamental behaviour made those in the vicinity fear for their safety. As one IMSA official put it, "Senior is the most terrifying man I have ever met. Temper tantrums and wild outbursts are pretty commonplace in racing, but Senior's extend way beyond that. He is more than frightening. He is scary." He once stormed into his racing offices and threw a full briefcase across the room like a Frisbee. "If it had hit a secretary, it would have taken her head off," reported a witness. "And I know he never looked before he threw. He could have killed someone."

Racing promoter Steve Earwood remembered an event between father and son at a Camel GT race in 1982. "The kid had just won the pole and we had him on a radio show and everyone was in a good mood... he couldn't have been happier," Earwood said. But, then "the old man showed up with his bride-to-be... (and) started screaming and yelling and chewed the kid up and down and sideways for something that had happened earlier. It was quite a scene and it rattled the hell out of the kid. He never did recover the rest of the night. He just looked beat." When asked if he was afraid of his father, Paul Jr. said, "My father can be very intimidating at times." John's son, John Paul Jr., passed away on December 29, 2020, at the age of sixty.

Investigation
After receiving information that John was initially in Montego Bay, Jamaica, detectives tried to question him but he disappeared. 
Shortly after his disappearance, Paul Sr. was spotted by a passerby in the Fiji Islands who had recognized him from an episode of Unsolved Mysteries. Authorities could do little, though, as Fiji and the United States do not share an extradition treaty. When John was in Fiji in 2004, a friend of his was aboard his boat and had doubts about him and his ties to Colleen. The authorities received a laptop that the female acquaintance had managed to steal from the boat. Later, it was established that Colleen owned the computer. The detectives were able to identify some of the transactions John Paul made with Colleen's account due to information found on the computer. 

Detectives last received information regarding John's whereabouts in 2009, while he and his boat were in Thailand. He had plans to start a diving business off the Thai coast. Having sailed back to Europe, he allegedly sold his sailboat Diamond Girl in 2011 via a magazine classified ad in Italy. The FBI wish to question him about Wood's disappearance, although they have no new leads. John Paul has since been observed in ports all around Asia and Europe. He was also profiled in an episode of Disappeared'' in 2012.  Police want to re-interview Paul about the disappearances of his two wives because he has not been found and is still seen as a person of interest in both cases. He is also wanted for violating his parole. He has not yet returned to the United States.

Racing record

Career highlights

Complete 24 Hours of Le Mans results

Complete 24 Hours of Daytona results

Complete 12 Hours of Sebring results

See also
List of fugitives from justice who disappeared

References

1939 births
2000s missing person cases
12 Hours of Sebring drivers
24 Hours of Daytona drivers
24 Hours of Le Mans drivers
American drug traffickers
Dutch emigrants to the United States
Harvard Business School alumni
IMSA GT Championship drivers
Trans-Am Series drivers
World Sportscar Championship drivers
Auto racing controversies